The Museu Rodin Bahia is a museum devoted to the works of Auguste Rodin, in Salvador, Bahia, Brazil.

See also
 List of single-artist museums

References

Dear, John (August 12, 2007). How an International Bank Sank Millions in Brazil for Some Rodin Fakes, Brazzil Magazine.

Art museums and galleries in Brazil
Rodin
Museums in Salvador, Bahia
Rodin
Auguste Rodin